Rhizocorallium is an ichnogenus of burrow, the inclination of which is typically within 10° of the bedding planes of the sediment. These burrows can be very large, over a meter long in sediments that show good preservation, e.g. Jurassic rocks of the Yorkshire Coast (eastern United Kingdom), but the width is usually only up to 2 cm, restricted by the size of the organisms producing it. It is thought that they represent fodinichnia as the animal (probably a polychaete) scoured the sediment for food.

Ichnogenus
The ichnogenus Rhizocorallium Zenker 1836 includes three ichnospecies: Rhizocorallium jenense Zenker 1836 representing straight, short U-shaped spreite-burrows commonly oblique to bedding plane, and only rarely horizontal, Rhizocorallium irregulare Mayer 1954 representing long, sinuous, bifurcating or planispiral U-shaped spreite-burrows, mainly horizontal, and Rhizocorallium uliarense Firtion 1958 representing trochospiral U-shaped spreite-burrows (definitions after Fürsich 1974).

References
 Fürsich, F.T. 1974. Ichnogenus Rhizocorallium. Paläontologische Zeitschrift 48, 16–28. 
 Kowal-Linka M., Bodzioch A. 2011. Sedimentological implications of an unusual form of the trace fossil Rhizocorallium from the Lower Muschelkalk (Middle Triassic), S. Poland. Facies 57: 695–703.
 Rodríguez-Tovar, F., J., Pérez-Valera F. 2008. Trace fossil Rhizocorallium from the Middle Triassic of the Betic Cordillera, southern Spain: characterization and environmental implications. Palaios, 23, p. 78–86.
 Schlirf, M. 2000. Upper Jurassic trace fossils from the Boulonnais (northern France). Geologica et Palaeontologica, 34: 145–213.

Burrow fossils